Falls Reservoir is part of the Yadkin River Project in North Carolina and managed by Alcoa as part of their hydroelectric business. It is the last of four reservoirs along a  stretch of the Yadkin River. The hydroelectric operation was sold to Cube Hydro Carolinas in February 2017.

Other lakes in the Yadkin River Project
High Rock Lake
Tuckertown Reservoir
Badin Lake

References

External links
Current conditions, as reported by Alcoa

Protected areas of Montgomery County, North Carolina
Reservoirs in North Carolina
Protected areas of Stanly County, North Carolina
Dams in North Carolina
Alcoa Power Generating dams
Yadkin-Pee Dee River Basin
Landforms of Montgomery County, North Carolina
Landforms of Stanly County, North Carolina